Gunnar Persson (13 October 1933 – 8 April 2018) was a Swedish cartoonist and comic creator. He was the son of Elov Persson, creator of one of Sweden's oldest comic strip characters, Kronblom. Gunnar began drawing the Kronblom comic strip in 1968 when his father's health got worse. Prior to Kronblom, Gunnar Persson had already drawn the comic strips Gus and Herr Larsson in the comic book 91:an.

References

External links 
Gunnar Persson at Lambiek.net (see Lambiek)

1933 births
2018 deaths
Swedish cartoonists
People from Hofors Municipality